Cao Lãnh is the name of the following geographical locations in Đồng Tháp Province, Vietnam:

Cao Lãnh (city), capital of Đồng Tháp Province
Cao Lãnh District, a rural district

See also
Cao Lãnh Bridge, a cable-stayed bridge over the Tiền River